Peter Cowperthwaite Godsoe, BSc, MBA,  (born May 2, 1938) is a Canadian businessman and former President, Chairman and Chief executive officer of the Bank of Nova Scotia from 1992 to 2003. He is a member of the board of directors of multiple corporations, and serves as the Chairman of Fairmont Hotels and Resorts and Sobeys.

Born in Toronto, Ontario, the son of J. Gerald "Gerry" and Margaret (Cowperthwaite) Godsoe, he graduated from the University of Toronto Schools before receiving a Bachelor of Science in Mathematics and Physics from the University of Toronto and a MBA from the Harvard Business School. He is also a Chartered accountant and a Fellow of the Institute of Chartered Accountants of Ontario (post-nominal FCA). Godsoe joined the Bank of Nova Scotia in 1966 as a bank teller.

Godsoe was the Chancellor of the University of Western Ontario from 1996 to 2000. In 2001, he was made an Officer of the Order of Canada. In 2002, he was inducted into the Canadian Business Hall of Fame. In 2004, he was made an honorary Commander of the Order of Jamaica.

Godsoe has received honorary degrees from University of King's College (1993), Concordia University (1995), University of Western Ontario (2001), and Dalhousie University (2004).

References

External links
Order of Canada Citation

1938 births
Scotiabank presidents
Businesspeople from Toronto
Chancellors of the University of Western Ontario
Harvard Business School alumni
Living people
Members of the Order of Ontario
Officers of the Order of Canada
Rogers Communications
University of Toronto alumni
Directors of Scotiabank
Canadian corporate directors
Canadian chairpersons of corporations
Canadian chief executives
Members of the Order of Jamaica
Directors of Onex Corporation